Beryl Fowler, née Mary Beryl Menzies (1881–1963) was an English painter. Her oil paintings often depict rural life in Eskdale, Cumbria in England.

Biography 
Mary Beryl Menzies was born in 1881 in Newcastle upon Tyne. Her father was an engineer. She was married to painter and teacher, Francis "Frank" Hugh Fowler (1878–1945) of Repton. She and her husband studied with German artist Hubert von Herkomer at Herkomer's Art School in Bushey, Hertfordshire.

Her work is included in various museum collections including the Bushey Museum & Art Gallery, the Armitt Museum and Library, the Beacon Museum in Whitehaven, and the Laing Art Gallery.

See also 
 List of museums in Cumbria

References 

1881 births
1963 deaths
English women painters
Artists from Newcastle upon Tyne
People from Bushey